Tomaso Smith (15 June 1886 – 27 May 1966) was an Italian screenwriter, politician, journalist, translator and newspaper editor active during the Fascist era. He started his career as a stringer for the Roman newspaper Il Messaggero but was forced to resign for his socialist stance. He then embarked on a career as screenwriter and playwright until the outbreak of the War. Smith was imprisoned in a German detention camp in Italy in 1943 but was able to escape. At the end of the war Il Messaggero offered him the editor's post. In the 1950s he began a career in politics, first as an independent with the Italian Communist Party and then with Adriano Olivetti's Community Movement, where he was involved in attempts to start a newspaper, La Giustizia ("Justice").

Selected filmography
 Figaro and His Great Day (1931)
 The Blue Fleet (1932)
 The Last Adventure (1932)
 The Blind Woman of Sorrento (1934)
 Loyalty of Love (1934)
 Port (1934)
 Red Passport (1935)
 To Live (1937)
 The Fornaretto of Venice (1939)
 The Widow (1939)
 Father For a Night (1939)
 Kean (1940)
 Lucrezia Borgia (1940)
 The King's Jester (1941)
 Beatrice Cenci (1941)
 The Gorgon (1942)
 The Woman of Sin (1942)
 Maria Malibran (1943)
 The Champion (1943)
 Resurrection (1944)

References

Bibliography
 Matilde Hochkofler. Anna Magnani. Gremese Editore, 2001.

External links

1886 births
1966 deaths
20th-century Italian screenwriters
Italian male screenwriters
Writers from Tuscany
People from the Province of Lucca
Italian newspaper editors
Politicians of Tuscany
Italian people of English descent
20th-century Italian journalists
20th-century Italian translators
20th-century Italian male writers